Aberdeen competed in the Scottish Premier League, Scottish Cup and Scottish League Cup during the 2008–09 season.

Richie Byrne, Barry Nicholson, Steve Lovell, Derek Soutar, Dave Bus, Jonathan Smith, Greg Kelly, Alan Maybury, Jackie McNamara and Dan Smith all left the club, mostly on Bosman transfers, and Josh Walker returned down South to Middlesbrough. On 5 July 2008, Karim Touzani returned to his native homeland of Netherlands to sign for Dutch side Sparta Rotterdam.

The club brought in several players; Bertrand Bossu, Sammy Stewart, Gary McDonald, Mark Kerr, Charlie Mulgrew were all given two-year contracts by the club. Tommy Wright signed from Darlington, he cost £100,000 and was given a three-year contract. The club signed Jared Hodgkiss on loan from West Bromwich Albion for the first half of the season, and in January signed Manchester City youngster Javan Vidal until the end of the season. On transfer deadline day, the club signed Sone Aluko from Birmingham City for an undisclosed fee.

Review

Pre-season
Aberdeen kicked off their pre-season campaign with a 2–0 loss at home to English and European champions, Manchester United. The game marked the 25th anniversary of Aberdeen's 2–1 victory over Real Madrid in the 1982–82 UEFA Cup Winners' Cup final in Gothenburg. Goals from Michael Carrick and Wayne Rooney ensured that Sir Alex Ferguson won on his return to Pittodrie. Three days later the Dons faced 'local rivals' Dundee, The game finished 0–0. The worst result of the pre-season came next, a 4–0 defeat by Peterhead, however Aberdeen recorded their first win of pre-season against Brechin City three days later, Derek Young getting the only goal; and the first of pre-season.

Aberdeen opened their tour of the Netherlands with a 5–0 win over Jimmy Calderwood's son Scott's DZC 68. Chris Maguire scored a hat-trick, Lee Miller and Jamie Smith were also on the scoresheet against the minnows. New signing Gary McDonald scored his first goal for the Dons against FC Zwolle, however two late goals meant that Aberdeen would suffer their first and only defeat of the Dutch tour. The next game saw Aberdeen play top-tier team Vitesse Arnhem, which they won 1–0 thanks to an Andrew Considine goal twenty minutes from time. Aberdeen had been due to play Go Ahead Eagles but the game was scrapped due to police fears of crowd trouble. Instead a game was arranged against minnows SV Rietvogels, in which the Dons scored 10 goals. Captain Scott Severin scored an early goal, the lead was soon doubled by youngster Peter Pawlett, Other goalscorers included Chris Maguire, Jeffrey de Visscher and Michael Paton; trialist Dyon Camero scored four.

Aberdeen followed up their pre-season tour of the Netherlands with a win against Highland league team Inverurie Loco Works at Harlaw Park. Manager Jimmy Calderwood fielded a young team and for the first time Zander Diamond led the team out as captain. Within 17 minutes Aberdeen were 1–0 ahead; U-19 player Michael Paton scored his second goal in as many games, Summer signing, Sammy Stewart scored his first goal for the club; 11 minutes from time, to make it 2–0 and that was the final score.

SPL

August
Aberdeen began their SPL campaign with a 2–0 loss at home to North 'rivals' Inverness Caledonian Thistle through goals from Andrew Barrowman and Roy McBain. It was the first time that Aberdeen had been beaten by Inverness, having played them 17 times previously. The Dons travelled to Motherwell for their second game, The match was goalless until four minutes from time, when summer signing Charlie Mulgrew scored from a free-kick, to give Aberdeen their first win. Aberdeen then hosted Glasgow rivals Rangers. Veteran Scotland defender David Weir opened the scoring for the visitors, Derek Young followed up after Lee Miller's shot was blocked by rangers keeper Allan McGregor; to score Aberdeen's first goal of the new season at Pittodrie. The match ended 1–1, but aberdeen were fortunate as DaMarcus Beasley seemed to have won it for Rangers in stoppage time; his goal was disallowed for offside he was however clearly onside. Aberdeen then travelled to Paisley to play St Mirren. A mistake by the St Mirren defence allowed Darren Mackie to score a goal just before half-time, which proved to be the winner.

September
September, and Aberdeen's first match was a home tie against SPL newcomers Hamilton Academical. The game saw the second debut of Sone Aluko, following his return. Aberdeen took the lead in the 7th minute, summer signing Gary McDonald scored the goal, with Hamilton goalkeeper Tomas Cerny only able to push the ball onto the post and into the net. Hamilton equalised after 34 minutes, David Graham the scorer. A defensive mistake by the Aberdeen defence allowed Hamilton's James McCarthy to score what turned out to be the winner. Aluko hit the bar with a late free-kick, the defeat meant that Aberdeen were still to win at home. Another home defeat followed the week after, Tommy Wright was given his first league start by manager Jimmy Calderwood and it was his handball which allowed Francesco Sandaza to score the only goal from the penalty spot. Aberdeen ended the month with a trip to reigning Champions Celtic. A defensive mistake allowed Dutchman Jan Vennegoor of Hesselink to score the opening goal. Aberdeen equalised early in the second half; Charlie Mulgrew claimed his second goal of the SPL campaign, He scored his third as well minutes later, when he curled a free-kick from the edge of the box, to make the score 2–1 to Aberdeen. Celtic equalised eleven minutes from time when Scott McDonald headed the ball into the net, Vennegoor of Hesselink scored an injury time winner making the score 3–2. This left Aberdeen eleventh in the league table, they had not gained a single point throughout the month of September.

October
Hibernian came to Pittodrie for Aberdeen's first match in October. A defensive slip by Lee Mair allowed Hibernian striker Derek Riordan to open the scoring after 33 minutes, Lee Miller equalised 8 minutes later from the penalty spot after being fouled by Sol Bamba. Hibernian regained the lead from the penalty spot after Mulgrew, who was red-carded, handled the ball on the line. The ball was directed towards goal by Hibernian striker Steven Fletcher, he was clearly offside but it was not given, so Riordan converted to score his second of the match. Aberdeen then traveled to Falkirk after an International break. Lee Miller headed the only goal to give Aberdeen their first victory in six games, and lift the Dons' off the bottom of the table. Lee Bullen was sent off for Falkirk late on, after a challenge on Scott Severin. Aberdeen then travelled to Edinburgh for the first time in the season to play Heart of Midlothian. It started well for the Dons', Darren Mackie profited from a defensive error and scored the first goal of the game. Hearts however, shortly after, equalised through wing-back Lee Wallace. In the dying minutes, Hearts looked to have been awarded a penalty by referee Steve Conroy, Jamie Langfield appeared to have tripped Michael Stewart in the penalty area, But after consulting with his assistant, the referee reversed his decision and the match finished 1–1.

November
Aberdeen started November with a home-tie against high-flyers Kilmarnock. A goal by Sone Aluko handed Aberdeen their first home win of the season, and more importantly, all three points. The following week Aberdeen travelled to Dundee to face Dundee United for the second New Firm Derby of the season. It got off to another bad start for the Dons, Francisco Sandaza scored the opening goal in the opening 8 minutes, Northern-Irish striker Warren Feeney doubled the 'tangerine's' advantage on 14 minutes. Aberdeen pulled a goal back through Darren Mackie, but it proved to only be a consolation goal, as the Dons' lost the derby 2–1, although they had a goal disallowed for offside. The Dons' then hosted St Mirren in a midweek match at Pittodrie. Both the goals in the 2–0 win were scored in the last 10 minutes, First defender Andrew Considine finished well after good work by Mark Kerr then Englishman Sone Aluko was put clean-through on goal to score the second. The win propelled Aberdeen up to fourth in the league for the first time. Aberdeen then played Hibernian in their second trip to the capital. The Dons opened the scoring just before half-time when Darren Mackie pounced on Rob Jones' error to head the visitors in front, four minutes before half-time. Aberdeen doubled their lead eight minutes after the break when Sone Aluko flighted in a corner and Zander Diamond headed in his first goal of the season and put the Dons' 2–0 up. Three points turned into one point as Rob Jones made amends for his first half error and pulled one back for Hibs with a header in the 62nd minute, and with virtually the last kick of the game Steven Fletcher scrambled in a goal. Aberdeen then travelled to Glasgow to play Rangers at Ibrox. Aberdeen dominated the first half and it took a good save from Rangers' keeper Allan McGregor to prevent Derek Young from scoring the opening goal. The Dons' continued to hold the upper hand until Jean-Claude Darcheville bundled the ball over the line to put Rangers 1–0 up. Zander Diamond was unlucky not to level when his header was cleared off the line by Pedro Mendes. Seconds later Rangers had the ball in the net again, this time through Kris Boyd. The game finished 2–0 to Rangers. Aberdeen then hosted Motherwell at Pittodrie. Motherwell keeper Graeme Smith pulled off a fantastic save to prevent Darren Mackie from opening the scoring. However, on the hour mark, just seconds after coming on as a second-half substitute Gary McDonald headed the Dons' in front after fine work from Sone Aluko. It was 2–0 eight six minutes later, when Jeffrey de Visscher whipped in a cross, only for Darren Mackie to be hauled down by Motherwell defender Paul Quinn. Referee Chris Boyle showed a red card to Quinn for his last man challenge, and awarded a penalty to the Dons', which Lee Miller happily dispatched. The game finished 2–0 and moved the Dons' up to fifth in the table.

December
Aberdeen's opening game in December was against Kilmarnock, however the game was postponed due to a frozen pitch at Rugby Park. Next the Dons welcomed Falkirk to Pittodrie. Lee Miller got his fifth and sixth goals of the season in the opening half, of home side dominance. The second half was less great, ex-Aberdeen player Steve Lovell got a late consolation goal, but it was too little too late, as the Dons ran out 2–1 winners. A trip up North to the Caledonian Stadium to play North 'rivals', Inverness C.T. Aberdeen got off to the best of starts when Charlie Mulgrew fired a free-kick passed ex-Don Ryan Esson in only the sixth minute. Gary McDonald doubled the lead when he capitalized on Dougie Imrie's mistake to double the Dons' lead. Five minutes later, Darren Mackie made it three, as he scored his fifth goal of the campaign, with a clinical chip, over the advancing Esson. Aberdeen ran out 3–0 winners leaving them 5th placed in the table. Hearts were visitors to Pittodrie the following week. On form striker Lee Miller scored the only goal of the game in front of a packed Pittodrie. Miller, met Severin's free-kick and scored with a brilliant volley, towards the end of the first half. In a pulsating game, Aberdeen ran out 1–0 winners, and Hearts had Marius Žaliūkas and Lee Wallace sent off. As Aberdeen finished 2008 on a high.

January
Aberdeen's opening game of 2009 resulted in a disappointing 2–0 defeat away to Hamilton Academical. Simon Mensing converted a penalty to put Hamilton 1–0 up, and Richard Offiong completed the scoring. However, Offiong was later sent off following two bookable offences. On Tuesday 13th, Aberdeen traveled to Ayr, to play December's postponement against Kilmarnock. Killie took the lead when the ball fell nicely to Allan Russell who finished well. Aberdeen equalised on the half-hour, when Lee Miller met Mulgrew's corner fantastically, scoring with a back-heel volley. And it was Miller who grabbed the winner, when he met Mackie's cross with a diving header. Aberdeen won the game 2–1 and that moved Aberdeen up to fourth. Aberdeen were to host both sides of the Old Firm in the space of two weeks, up first were Celtic, a team who Aberdeen have never beaten at Pittodrie since 2002. The game turned out to be a classic. Stuart Duff crossed the ball for Gary McDonald to open the scoring with a looping header. Celtic were back on level terms within a minute, as a cut-back by Aiden McGeady found Scott Brown unmarked to score the equaliser. Duff then got on the score-sheet himself, with a well taken volley. After immense pressure from Celtic in the second half, Scott McDonald pulled Celtic back on level terms again when he headed in Barry Robson's cross. However, Aberdeen were not to be denied the win, as Zander Diamond headed in two Charlie Mulgrew free-kicks in the space of two minutes to give the Dons' a 4–2 win against the reigning champions. The crowd were left chanting for five. The following week, a packed Pittodrie watched Aberdeen take on the second half of the Old Firm, Rangers. A dull game saw very little chances until in the 80th minute Nacho Novo found space at the back post, but his shot rebounded off of the post. Darren Mackie and Charlie Mulgrew went close for Aberdeen, but both defences stayed firm as the sides settled for a 0–0 draw. Aberdeen then travelled to Falkirk. Once again a dull away performance saw Michael Higdon score the only goal as the Bairns' won 1–0.

Scottish Cup
Aberdeen started their Scottish Cup with a 2–1 win against Second Division side Alloa Athletic. A cool Sone Aluko provided the Dons' with the class they needed to scrape past a spirited Alloa side. On form striker Lee Miller opened the scoring after he deflected Chris Maguire's shot. Alloa midfielder Andy Scott scored from the penalty spot to equalise for the hosts. Aluko raced clear and chipped the ball over the advancing keeper Raymond Jellema in the 56th minute. Alloa pushed forward for much of the last half-hour, but Aberdeen survived to progress. In the fifth-round, Aberdeen were then drawn at home against another Second Division team, East Fife. The game ended in a comfortable 5–0 victory, with the East Fife goalkeeper sent off in the first three minutes. Goals from Tommy Wright, Javan Vidal, Sone Aluko and a late Chris Maguire double sealed the win for Aberdeen, earning them an away tie at Dunfermline Athletic. Sone Aluko looked to have put Aberdeen through to a semi-final when he finished neatly midway through the second half. However Nick Phinn scored with just five minutes remaining, to force a reply at Pittodrie. The replay proved to be a night to forget. A highly disappointing display saw 120 minutes of no goals, and very little activity. Dunfermline eventually won the game on penalties, Scott Severin and Richard Foster were the only players to have missed which sent the Dons' out.

Scottish League Cup
Aberdeen travelled to Ayr to play Second Division Ayr United in the second round of the League Cup, Chris Maguire scored the only goal of the game after 40 minutes to secure Aberdeen's place in the third round. In the third round of the league cup, Aberdeen were drawn away against fellow SPL club Kilmarnock. The hosts took the lead in the first minute, Conor Sammon opened the scoring only for Gary McDonald to equalise for the visitors. Kilmarnock were back in front five minutes later through David Fernandez, Mehdi Taouil extended the home side's advantage with a penalty. Lee Miller pulled a goal back from the penalty spot, after Darren Mackie was fouled. However, Conor Sammon scored his second of the evening. The match finished 4–2 to Kilmarnock, Aberdeen were out of the League Cup at the third round stage.

Squad

First team squad
Updated 30 June 2009.

Transfers

Summer Transfer Window (1 July – 1 September 2008)
In Permanent

Loans in

Out Permanent

Winter Transfer Window (1 January – 2 February 2009)
Loans in

Out Permanent

Statistics

Appearances & Goals

|}

Source: Soccerbase

Disciplinary record

Source: BBC Sport

Captains

Source: BBC match reports

Most Appearances

Source: above appearances and goals table

Top scorers

Source: above appearances and goals table

Awards

Clydesdale Bank Awards

Results and fixtures

Pre-season friendlies

Scottish Premier League

Scottish League Cup

Scottish Cup

Competitions

Overall

SPL

Classification

Results summary

Results by round

Results by opponent

Source: 2008–09 Scottish Premier League article

Club

Management

Other information

Team kit

|
|
|}

See also
 List of Aberdeen F.C. seasons

Notes and references

External links
 Aberdeen FC website
 BBC My Club page

Aberdeen F.C. seasons
Aberdeen